A Story, a Story is a children's picture book written and illustrated by Gail E. Haley that retells the African tale of how the trickster Anansi obtained stories from the Sky God to give to the children of the earth. The book was produced after Gail E. Haley spent a year in the Caribbean researching the African roots of many Caribbean tales. Released by Atheneum, it was the recipient of the Caldecott Medal for illustration in 1971.

In other media
The book was animated by filmmaker Gene Deitch for Weston Woods Studios in 1971. The animation was carried out at Kratky Film Prague, with the narration by Dr John Akar and "African music recreated" by Dr Vaclav Kubica using African instruments loaned from the Náprstek Museum Prague.

References

American picture books
Children's fiction books
Caldecott Medal–winning works
1970 children's books
African folklore
Atheneum Books books